Cyclostrema prominulum is a species of sea snail, a marine gastropod mollusk in the family Liotiidae.

Description
The height of the shell attains 1 mm and its diameter 2 mm. It is a very minute, deeply umbilicate, white shell with a depressed discoidal shape. The shell contains four whorls. The two apical whorls are very small. The surface is uniformly multilirate. The lirae at the periphery are metamorphosed into  a strong, very prominent and acute keel. The aperture is round. The outer lip is thin.

Distribution
This species occurs in the Gulf of Oman.

References

 Trew, A., 1984. The Melvill-Tomlin Collection. Part 30. Trochacea. Handlists of the Molluscan Collections in the Department of Zoology, National Museum of Wales

External links
 To World Register of Marine Species

prominulum
Gastropods described in 1903